Apocalyptic Feasting is the second release and debut album by the technical death metal band Brain Drill. It is the last release by the band to feature bassist Jeff Hughell and drummer Marco Pitruzella before their departure from Brain Drill during 2008.

History 
In August 2007, Brain Drill signed a worldwide deal with Metal Blade Records, and shortly after the quartet composed of founding member, guitarist Dylan Ruskin, vocalist Steve Rathjen, bassist Jeff Hughell, and drummer Marco Pitruzella, recorded with producer Zack Ohren, their full-length debut at Castle Ultimate Studios, in Oakland, California.

Critical reception 

Apocalyptic Feasting was well received by critics, the reviewers wrote mostly praising the band's musicianship.

Track listing

Personnel 
Brain Drill
 Jeff Hughell – bass guitar
 Dylan Ruskin – guitar
 Marco Pitruzella – drums
 Steve Rathjen – vocals
Production
 Zack Ohren – producer, master, mixer
 Pär Olofsson – artwork

References 

2008 debut albums
Brain Drill albums
Metal Blade Records albums
Albums with cover art by Pär Olofsson